Sattrupai Sri-narong is a Thai former professional footballer.

Honours

Thailand Premier League: Champion (1998), Runner-up (1997) with Sinthana
Thailand FA Cup: 1997 with Sinthana
Kor Royal Cup: 1997, 1998 with Sinthana

External links
Profile at Thaipremierleague.co.th
http://uk.soccerway.com/players/sattrupai-sri-narong/73349/

Living people
Sattrupai Sri-narong
1977 births
Association football midfielders
Sattrupai Sri-narong
Sattrupai Sri-narong
Sattrupai Sri-narong
Sattrupai Sri-narong
Sattrupai Sri-narong
Sattrupai Sri-narong